The Lagos State Ministry of Special Duties is the state government ministry, charged with the responsibility to plan, devise and implement the state policies on Special Duties.

See also
Lagos State Ministry of Local Government and Chieftaincy Affairs
Lagos State Executive Council

References

Government ministries of Lagos State